HMS Challenger was a steam-assisted Royal Navy Pearl-class corvette launched on 13 February 1858 at the Woolwich Dockyard. She was the flagship of the Australia Station between 1866 and 1870.

As part of the North America and West Indies Station she took part in 1862 in operations during the Second French intervention in Mexico, including the occupation of Veracruz. Assigned as the flagship of Australia Station in 1866, in 1868 she undertook a punitive expedition against Fiji to avenge the murders of a missionary and some of his dependents, shelling and burning a village and killing more than 40 native Wainimala. She left the Australian Station in late 1870.

She was picked to undertake the first global marine research expedition: the Challenger expedition.
Challenger carried a complement of 243 officers, scientists and crew when she embarked on her  journey.

The United States Space Shuttle Challenger was named after the ship. Her figurehead is on display in the foyer of the National Oceanography Centre, Southampton.

1873–1876: Grand tour

The Challenger Expedition, which embarked from Portsmouth, England, on 21 December 1872, was a grand tour of the world covering 68,000 nautical miles (125,936 km) organized by the Royal Society in collaboration with the University of Edinburgh. Charles Thomson was the leader of a large scientific team.

 Captains: George Nares (1873 and 1874) and Frank Tourle Thomson (1874 to 1876)
 Naturalists: Charles Wyville Thomson (1830–1882), Henry Nottidge Moseley (1844–1891) and Rudolf von Willemoes-Suhm (1847–1875)
 Oceanographers: John Young Buchanan (1844–1925) and John Murray (1841–1914)
 Publications: C.W. Thomson, Report on the scientific results of the voyage of HMS Challenger during the years 1873–76... prepared under the superintendence of the late Sir C. Wyville Thomson,... and now of John Murray,... (fifty volumes, London, 1880–1895). H.N. Moseley, Notes by a naturalist on the Challenger (1879). W.J.J. Spry, The cruise of the Challenger (1876).

To enable her to probe the depths, all but two of Challengers guns had been removed and her spars reduced to make more space available. Laboratories, extra cabins and a special dredging platform were installed. She was loaded with specimen jars, alcohol for preservation of samples, microscopes and chemical apparatus, trawls and dredges, thermometers and water sampling bottles, sounding leads and devices to collect sediment from the sea bed and great lengths of rope with which to suspend the equipment into the ocean depths. In all she was supplied with 181 miles (291 km) of Italian hemp for sounding, trawling and dredging.

Challengers crew was the first to sound the deepest part of the ocean, thereafter named the Challenger Deep.

Later service history
She was commissioned as a Coast Guard and Royal Naval Reserve training ship at Harwich in July 1876.

In 1878 Challenger went through an overhaul by the Chief Constructor at Chatham Dockyard with a view to converting the vessel into a training ship for boys of the Royal Navy. She was found suitable and it was planned to take the place of HMS Eurydice which sank off the Isle of Wight on 24 March 1878. The Admiralty did not go ahead with the conversion and she remained in reserve until 1883, when she was converted into a receiving hulk in the River Medway, where she stayed until she was sold to J B Garnham on 6 January 1921 and broken up for her copper bottom that same year.

Only her figurehead now remains, kept at the National Oceanography Centre, Southampton.

See also
 European and American voyages of scientific exploration

References

Further reading

External links

 

1858 ships
Pearl-class corvettes
Ships built in Chatham
Exploration ships
Exploration ships of the United Kingdom
Research vessels of the United Kingdom
Survey vessels of the Royal Navy
1858 establishments in England